Dimmitt Independent School District is a public school district based in Dimmitt, Texas (USA).

In 2009, the school district was rated "academically acceptable" by the Texas Education Agency.

References

External links
Dimmitt ISD

School districts in Castro County, Texas